Beth Slater Whitson (December 1, 1879 – April 26, 1930) was an American lyricist.  She was born on December 1, 1879, in Goodrich, Tennessee and died on April 26, 1930. She was the daughter of John H. Whitson and Anna Slater Whitson. Her Father was the Co- Editor of the Hickman Pioneer Newspaper. Whitson began her songwriting in Hickman country.  In 1913 Whitson and her family moved to Nashville where she and sister Alice continued to write and publish, Beth’s local biographer, Grace Baxter Thompson, remarked at the dedication of a state historical marker to Whitson’s career in 1978: “She gave beauty and color and enjoyment to her community from which those qualities have been far-reaching and long-lasting”. She composed lyrics to over 400 songs, and is best remembered for the songs "Meet Me Tonight in Dreamland" (1909) and "Let Me Call You Sweetheart" (1910), both becoming one of the largest selling songs in sheet music. Her first major hit Meet Me Tonight in Dreamland really became known in 1949 when it was featured in the movie In the Good Old Summertime She wrote the words to her songs but got someone else to write the music.

In 1913, Whitson and her family moved to Nashville, Tennessee, where she and her sister, Alice, continued to write.

"Let me call you sweetheart I'm in love with you. Let me hear you whisper that you love me too"  - Beth Slater Whitson, from Let Me Call You Sweetheart

Short stories 
Beth didn't just write songs but also wrote amazing stories and poems. One of those stories, “The Knitter Of Liege” was named as a National top fifty short story for the year 1916. Alice, Beth's sister also became known for her short stories. Whitson's stories were published in many magazines in the decade.

References 

1879 births
1930 deaths
Songwriters from Tennessee